Clelia Grillo Borromeo Arese or Celia Grillo Borromeo (1684 – 23 August 1777) was an Italian (Genovese) natural philosopher, mathematician and scientist.

Life and education
Borromeo was born in Genoa, the daughter of duke Marcantonio of Mondragone and Maria Antonia, the marquise Imperial.

Borromeo was educated in several languages, mathematics, natural science and mechanics. She spoke eight languages and was interested in geometry, natural science and mathematics. She was educated first by her mother and then in a convent, but it is unknown where she received education in the subjects she became known for.

In 1707, she married count Giovanni Borromeo Arese Benedict (1679–1744), and became the mother of eight children.

Borromeo died in Milan.

Contributions
She was famous for her ability to solve every mathematical problem presented to her. Borromeo was described as an independent person, which was regarded as eccentric because it was not considered natural for her gender. She was criticized for entertaining many scientists, both foreign and Italian, who were known as atheists. One of her guests was Antonio Vallisneri (1661–1733). She founded the academy nell'Academia Vigilantium Clelia in her salon in Milan, which was active in 1719–1726. During the war in 1746, Borromeo took the side of Spain against Austria and was therefore exiled. When she was allowed to return to Milan, she was celebrated as a heroine.

In 1728, Borromeo discovered the so-called Clélie curve : q = mƒ. When the longitude and colatitude of a point P on a sphere are denoted by q and ƒ and if P moves so that q = mƒ, where m is a constant, then the locus of P is called a clélie.

Recognition
The city of Genoa honored her with a medal with the inscription Genuensium Gloria (The Honor of Genoa).

References

  http://scienzaa2voci.unibo.it/biografie/56-grillo-borromeo-arese-clelia
 G. G. Fagioli Vercellone, Grillo, Clelia (del), in Dizionario biografico degli italiani, 55, Roma, Istituto della Enciclopedia Italiana, pp. 450–454.

1684 births
1777 deaths
Scientists from Genoa
18th-century Italian mathematicians
17th-century Italian mathematicians
Italian salon-holders
Italian countesses
18th-century Italian women
Italian women scientists
Women mathematicians
18th-century Italian women scientists
Women founders